Uruguay is located at a longitude appropriate for a UTC−04:00 time zone offset, but it actually uses a UTC−03:00 offset. Uruguay used to observe daylight saving time (UTC−02:00) from October till March. On 30 June 2015, the Uruguayan government decided to abolish DST, establishing the UTC−03:00 time zone all year round. The term "UYT" is used in and out of the country to convey specific Uruguay time.

IANA time zone database
In the file zone.tab of the IANA time zone database Uruguay has the following zone:
 America/Montevideo, covering all its territory

See also
Daylight saving time in Uruguay
Time in Argentina
Time in Brazil

References

External links